Negative partisanship is the tendency of some voters to form their political opinions primarily in opposition to political parties they dislike. Whereas traditional partisanship involves supporting the policy positions of one's own party, its negative counterpart in turn means opposing those positions of a disliked party. It has been claimed to be the cause of severe polarization in American politics. It has also been studied in the Canadian context, as well as in Australia and New Zealand. Cross-national studies indicate that negative partisanship undermines public satisfaction with democracy, which threatens democratic stability. Traditional partisans, on the other hand, are more likely to support their country's democracy, which promotes democratic stability.

United States 
Alan Abramowitz, a professor of political science at Emory University, likens negative partisanship to a sports rivalry, where members of one side may have internal disagreements but are motivated to a far greater extent by hatred of the other side. According to his research, negative feelings towards the opposing political party have risen above positive towards one's own political party since the 1980s, along with the increase in straight-ticket voting. The phenomenon of negative partisanship was further exacerbated during the 2016 election, in which both major candidates, Donald Trump and Hillary Clinton, received record low "feeling thermometer" ratings in a Pew Research Center study.

Rachel Bitecofer expands on Abramowitz's ideas, advocating a theory under which elections are fundamentally driven by voter turnout instead of swing voters as traditionally believed. In this framework, it is more important to turn out the base than appeal to ideological moderates. However, some like David Wasserman of The Cook Political Report have challenged this view, noting the phenomenon of Obama-Trump voters, or Americans who voted for Barack Obama in 2008 or 2012 (or both) and Donald Trump in 2016.

In other countries 
In a comparative study of elections in Australia, Canada, New Zealand, and the United States, researchers from the Université de Montréal examined the relationship between group identity, political ideology, positive party identification, negative party identification, and vote choice. Under the traditional left–right political spectrum, negative partisanship is not an independent factor distinct from positive partisan identity, with psychologists John T. Cacioppo and Gary Berntson placing positive and negative attitudes on a single bipolar continuum. However, more recent scholarship has found that positive and negative identity are not merely opposites. According to Henri Tajfel, members of a group must first gain a positive sense of identity before they can associate negative feelings with an outgroup. But once negative feelings are established, they may produce a stronger reaction in the brain due to negativity bias.

The Montréal researchers concluded that group identities are acquired early in life, and combine with ideology to determine positive party identification, but not negative party identification except in New Zealand. Under a logistic regression model with party identification and education as independent variables and vote choice as the dependent variable, both forms of party identification have a statistically significant impact on vote choice, while education is a significant determinant of vote choice for both parties only in the United States.

See also 

 Political polarization in the United States

References 

Political parties
Political terminology
Theories of political behavior